L!VE TV was a British television station that was operated by Mirror Group Newspapers on cable television from 12 June 1995 until 5 November 1999. It was later revived for Sky from 2003. In 2006, L!VE TV's name was changed to Babeworld to reflect the channel's gradual change of focus towards "adult material".

Background
L!VE TV was proposed by David Montgomery as part of MGN's move into pay television and due to the dominance on satellite of Sky Television, the decision was made to launch channels exclusively on cable. 

In February 1995, Mirror Television, a Mirror Group plc subsidiary, bought flagship cable channel Wire TV which included sports content shown at certain times during Wire's output. Sports programming on Wire had recently been expanded when several sporting rights were acquired, such as Vauxhall Conference football, the live broadcast rights to Lennox Lewis's WBC title fights and the 1996 Cricket World Cup, plus other sporting coverage following a deal with Chrysalis Sport. Mirror Group planned to turn Sportswire into a separate channel to operate alongside L!VE TV, both of which would replace Wire. Wire was closed on 31 May of that year; however TCI (owners of Telewest) and NYNEX made a deal with British Sky Broadcasting, which included a clause that the cable operators would not launch any rival channels to those already operated by Sky. Wire was closed on 31 May of that year; however TCI (owners of Telewest) and NYNEX made a deal with British Sky Broadcasting, which included a clause that the cable operators would not launch any rival channels to those already operated by Sky. Consequently, Sportswire collapsed just days before it was due to launch, leaving Mirror Television with just L!ve TV.

First incarnation (1995–1999)
At its launch in 1995, the station was headed by Kelvin MacKenzie with Janet Street-Porter as managing director and a team of young presenters who were new to TV. Street-Porter created a channel based around three blocks of live broadcasting each day from its base on the 24th floor of London's Canary Wharf building. The output was orientated towards a rolling mix of celebrities, interviews, reviews, lifestyle features and reports from events and happenings across the UK. A typical early show was a two-hour afternoon piece based on viewers' wedding videos. By the second week only one had been sent in, and on phoning the participants to have a live commentary, the presenters were informed that the couple were too busy shopping.

Three months after going on air, Street-Porter left due to clashes with MacKenzie over content. MacKenzie axed the rolling content and replaced it with programmes that received much media coverage but low viewer figures. These included Topless Darts, produced by future Times journalist Sathnam Sanghera with commentary by comedian Jimmy Frinton, the surreal talent show Spanish Archer, Talgarth Trousers, (a comedy sketch show) and Canary Wharf, a soap opera which used the station's offices in London Docklands as a set. Other features were the weather read in Norwegian by a blonde model (Eva Bjertnes or Anne-Marie Foss) wearing a bikini, Britain's Bounciest Weather with Rusty Goffe (known, although uncredited, for his appearance as an Oompa Loompa in the 1971 film Willy Wonka & the Chocolate Factory) who due to his small stature bounced on a trampoline while doing the forecast (bouncing higher the further north he was talking about), Tiffany's Big City Tips, in which model Tiffany Banister gave the financial news while stripping to her underwear, Painted Ladies, which involved topless girls "painting" on large sheets of paper with various body parts and the News Bunny, a person in a rabbit suit who stood behind a newsreader making gestures and expressions for each item. Considered cheap and always accused of poor taste, the channel never captured more than 1% of the British television audience under MGN, and at its worst was losing around £7 million a year. It was often described as "tabloid television", in part due to its control by MGN and because MacKenzie had been editor of The Sun.

At the end of 1995 and during 1996 the first local L!VE TV channels were launched in Liverpool and Edinburgh. These channels featured both local content and programming from London. A local version was also carried on BT-owned Westminster Cable, featuring local headlines but fewer and shorter opt-outs from than the Liverpool and Edinburgh channels. Around 20 stations had been planned to launch by the end of the 1990s but only a small number made it to air.

L!VE TV had a teletext service, initially operated by Intelfax Ltd.

Shortly before its demise in 1999, it was said that the channel would bid for rights to show FA Premier League football, but given the size of the financial commitment required, it is likely that it was merely a publicity stunt. However, Mirror Television had been a serious contender in 1996 and had formally entered the bidding process with Carlton Television but they were beaten by Sky Sports.

Closure
The station closed on 5 November 1999 at 6 pm with a caption over a black-and-white still of the station's cast and crew in the studio:

"L!ve TV: 15 August 1995 – 5 November 1999"

The date displayed was incorrect as the station had launched on 12 June 1995.

Second incarnation (2003–2006)
In 2003, L!VE TV returned as a free channel on Sky, first on EPG 274, then on 214. Its content was almost entirely archive from L!VE TV. Then in 2004, following competitor channels, its risqué archive of late-night offerings was supplemented with banners advertising adult text messaging.

Towards the end of 2005, the evening and late night were turned over to promoting adult text and phone-in services, involving models stripping to entice viewers into phoning or texting the studio. This was under the pretence that the viewer would get to talk to a studio guest.

By February 2006, content had dwindled to little more than these shows and it was moved to the adult section of Sky's EPG on 28 February 2006. Two days later, the name changed to Babeworld, ending links to the MGN operation. Babeworld closed on 22 October 2011, two days prior to Ofcom publishing a notice of revocation for its broadcast licence, ending eight years of the active Sky channel slot.

2007–present
A number of archive programmes from L!VE TV, including The Why Files and Lie Detector were shown on My Channel, formerly known as Eat Cinema, on Sky channel 199.

The entire L!VE TV archive and the rights to the channel's programming were sold on eBay in May 2013. On 3 June 2013, the winner of the sale bought the entire programming archive for £14,100.

Personnel

Presenters
 Matt Arnold
 Richard Bacon
 Donna Bernard
 Julia Bradbury
 Simon London
 Charlie Stayt
 Rhodri Williams
 Claudia Winkleman

Management
 Nick Ferrari
 Kelvin McKenzie
 Tony Orsten
 Rachel Purnell
 Janet Street-Porter
 Ruth Wrigley

See also 
 Canary Wharf
 News Bunny

References

Sources
 Chris Horrie, Adam Nathan, "L!ve TV: tellybrats and topless darts : the uncut story of tabloid television", Pocket Books, 1999,

External links
 L!VE TV online
 Babeworld.tv website (contains adult material)

Television channels in the United Kingdom
Defunct television channels in the United Kingdom
Television channels and stations established in 1995
Television channels and stations disestablished in 1999
Television channels and stations established in 2003
Television channels and stations disestablished in 2006
British companies established in 1995
British companies disestablished in 1999
British companies established in 2003
British companies disestablished in 2006